You Bet Your Life is an American comedy quiz series that has aired on both radio and television. The original and best-known version was hosted by Groucho Marx of the Marx Brothers, with announcer and assistant George Fenneman. The show debuted on ABC Radio on October 27, 1947, moved to CBS Radio debuting October 5, 1949, and went to NBC-TV and NBC Radio on October 4, 1950. Because of its simple format, it was possible to broadcast the show on both radio and television but not simultaneously. Many of the laughs on the television show were evoked by Groucho's facial reactions and other visual gimmicks; the two versions were slightly different. The last episode in a radio format aired on June 10, 1960. The series continued on television for another year, recording a season on September 22, 1960 with a new title, The Groucho Show.

Gameplay on each episode of You Bet Your Life was generally secondary to Groucho's comedic interplay with contestants and often with Fenneman. The show was so popular that it was the first primetime series to be shown in reruns during the summer months. The common practice at the time was to have a series go on hiatus during the summer, being replaced temporarily by a 13-week comedy or variety series before the main series returned in the fall. The You Bet Your Life summer reruns were broadcast as The Best of Groucho, to make clear to viewers that these were repeat broadcasts.

After the show went off the air, NBC prepared a syndicated version for local stations in 1961. Because the reruns were already established as The Best of Groucho, the syndicated version retained this title. NBC removed all references to the original sponsors by cropping the image whenever the sponsor's logo appeared, along with the "NBC" mark on Groucho's microphone. This is why some shots in the syndicated versions appear grainy and less focused: by deleting the sponsor's logo, the image zoomed in on what remained on the screen, sometimes cropping out a contestant while the screen showed only Groucho.

You Bet Your Life has been revived three times since the original series ended, the most recent being an ongoing version hosted by Jay Leno that launched in first-run syndication in September 2021.

History
The mid-1940s were a lull in Groucho Marx's career. His radio show Blue Ribbon Town, sponsored by Pabst Blue Ribbon beer, had begun in March 1943 and had failed to catch on. Groucho left the program in June 1944 and was replaced by vocalist Kenny Baker (who appeared with Groucho in 1939's At the Circus) until the show ended two months later. He also reluctantly appeared in two films with brothers Chico and Harpo Marx, A Night in Casablanca and the lackluster Love Happy.

During a radio appearance with Bob Hope in March 1947, Marx ad-libbed most of his performance after being forced to stand by in a waiting room for 40 minutes before going live on the air. John Guedel, the Hope program's producer, formed an idea for a quiz show and approached Marx about the subject.

After initial reluctance on Marx's part, Guedel was able to convince him to host the program once Marx realized the quiz would be only a backdrop for his contestant interviews and the storm of ad-libbing that they would elicit. Guedel also convinced Marx to invest in 50% of the show, in part by saying that he was "untouchable" at ad-libbing, but not at following a script.

As Marx and the contestants were ad-libbing, Guedel insisted that each show be filmed and edited before release to remove the risqué or less interesting material. The show for the studio audience ran longer than the broadcast version.

On December 28, 1949, episode #49-13 was filmed as a visual test in preparation for the show to be broadcast on television. The president of Film Craft Productions, Regina Lindenbaum (who did the subsequent filming), cited it as the first television show filmed before a live audience. Most television histories incorrectly credit I Love Lucy with that achievement, but Lucy premiered a year after Groucho's first filmed season. While filming both shows did indeed allow for greater control in post-production editing, the principal reason they were filmed was so that they could be produced in Hollywood before the advent of the "coaxial cable" that allowed live coast-to-coast broadcasts. They also produced clearer images for the West Coast than the fuzzy kinescope recordings that dominated network programming there in television's early days.

Gameplay

Contestant teams usually consisted of one male and one female, most of whom were selected from the studio audience. Occasionally, famous or otherwise interesting figures were invited to play (e.g., a Korean-American contestant who was a veteran and had been a prisoner of war during the Korean War).

Each episode began with the introduction "And now, here he is: the one, the only..." by Fenneman, who would pause, inviting the audience to finish the sentence by shouting in unison "GROUCHO!"  Groucho replies, "Oh, that's me!" and the show's band would then play a portion of the tune "Hooray for Captain Spaulding", Marx's signature song.  Groucho next would be introduced to the first two contestants and engage in humorous conversations in which he would improvise his responses or employ prepared lines written by the show's writers using pre-show interviews.  The total number of contestants in each episode varied depending on the length of Groucho's conversations and the time taken for gameplay in each segment.  Generally, however, the 30-minute format of the televised show provided time for two or three two-person teams to play in each episode.

Some show tension revolved around whether a contestant would say the "secret word", a common word revealed to the audience at the outset of each episode. If one of the contestants said the word, a toy duck resembling Groucho—with eyeglasses and a mustache—descended from the ceiling to bring a $100 prize, which would then be divided equally between that segment's two-person team. A cartoon of a duck with a cigar was also used in the opening title sequence. The duck was occasionally replaced with various other things, for example a wooden Indian figure, carrying the required $100 prize to the lucky team. In one episode, Groucho's brother Harpo came down instead of the duck, and in another a female model attired in a tight bodice and very short skirt came down in a birdcage with the money. In his conversations with contestants, Marx would at times direct their exchanges in ways to increase the likelihood that someone would use the secret word.

In November 1955, Groucho announced on the air that he had noticed the success of big-money quiz programs (referring to, but not naming, The $64,000 Challenge) and declared that You Bet Your Life was itself going to raise its "Secret Word" bonus: from $100 to $101. This gimmick lasted until the end of the year.

Formats

Main game
After the contestants' introduction and interview, the actual game began. Couples were allowed to choose from a list of 20 available categories before the show; then they tried to answer a series of questions within that category. From 1947 to 1956, couples were asked four questions.

 1947–1953 – Each couple began with $20, wagering part or all of their bankroll for each question.
 1953–1954 – Each couple now began with $0, but selected values from $10 to $100 (going up in $10 increments). A correct answer added the value of the question to their bankroll, while an incorrect answer did nothing. According to co-director Robert Dwan in his book As Long As They're Laughing, Guedel changed the scoring format because too many couples were betting, and losing, most or all of their money.
 1954–1956 – The format was slightly altered to start each couple with $100. Incorrect answers now cut their bankroll to that point in half.
 1956–1959 – Two couples (reduced from three) answered questions until they either gave two consecutive incorrect responses or answered four consecutive questions correctly for a prize of $1,000.
 1959–1961 – For the last two seasons, couples picked four questions worth $100, $200, or $300 each, potentially winning up to $1,200. Winning at least $500 qualified the team to go for the jackpot question.

From 1947 to 1956, if a couple ended their quiz with $25 or less, Marx would ask a very easy question so they could receive consolation money of $25 (later $100), which did not count toward the scores. The question was often patently obvious so there was virtually no chance that departing contestants would answer it incorrectly.  Some examples include the following:  "Who is buried in Grant's Tomb?", "When did the War of 1812 start?", "How long do you cook a three-minute egg?", and "What color is an orange?" The question about Grant's Tomb became such a staple of the show that both Marx and Fenneman were shocked when one man got the question "wrong" by answering "No one". As the contestant then pointed out, Grant's Tomb is an above-ground mausoleum.

Jackpot question
In all formats, one of the two players on the team could keep their half of the winnings while the other risked their half. In this case, all amounts being played for were divided in half.
1947–1956 – The highest-scoring couple was given one final question for the jackpot, which began at $1,000 and increased by $500 each week until won. In the event of a tie, the tied couples wrote their answers on paper and all couples who answered correctly split the jackpot. 
1956–1957 – For a brief period following the format change, couples who won the front game could wager half on another question worth $2,000.
1957–1959 – Winning couples now faced a wheel with numbers from 1–10, selecting one number for $10,000. If the number selected was spun, a correct answer to the jackpot question augmented the team's total winnings to that amount; otherwise, the question was worth a total of $2,000.
1959–1961 – For the last two seasons, the format was slightly altered to eliminate the risk and add a second number for $5,000.

Nielsen ratings
Seasonal Nielsen ratings covered the period between October and April of the following year. The rating number represents the percentage of homes tuned into that program.

Nielsen also measured the radio version at tenth among radio shows in 1955.

Despite not being involved with the quiz show scandals, the show's popularity waned and You Bet Your Life fell out of the top 25. NBC stopped making the show in 1961.

Sponsorship
The radio program was sponsored by Allen Gellman, president of Elgin American, maker of watch cases and compacts, during its first two and a half seasons. Later, seasons of the television show (as well as the radio show, after January 1950) were sponsored by Chrysler, with advertisements for DeSoto automobiles incorporated into the opening credits and the show itself. Each show would end with Marx sticking his head through a hole in the DeSoto logo and saying, "Friends...go in to see your DeSoto-Plymouth dealer tomorrow. And when you do, tell 'em Groucho sent you." Still later sponsors included the Toni Company (Prom home permanent, White Rain shampoo) with commercials featuring Harpo and Chico Marx, Lever Brothers (Lux liquid, Wisk detergent), Pharmaceuticals, Inc. (Geritol), and Lorillard Tobacco Co. (Old Gold cigarettes).

In 1953 the show became embroiled in controversy when its musical director, Jerry Fielding, was called to appear before the House Committee on UnAmerican Activities and refused to testify, citing his Fifth Amendment privileges. The show's sponsor, the DeSoto-Plymouth Dealers of America, demanded that Marx fire Fielding, and he complied. Fielding later accused the House committee of calling him up to testify because they wanted him to name Marx as a Communist sympathizer, and Marx himself later wrote, "That I bowed to sponsors' demands is one of the greatest regrets of my life."

Contestants
The interviews were sometimes so memorable that the contestants became celebrities: "nature boy" health advocate Robert Bootzin; Mexican-American entertainer Pedro Gonzalez-Gonzalez; comedians Phyllis Diller and Ronnie Schell; author Ray Bradbury; virtuoso cellist Ennio Bolognini; blues singer and pianist Gladys Bentley; strongmen Jack LaLanne and Paul Anderson; and actor John Barbour all appeared as contestants while working on the fringes of the entertainment industry.

Harland Sanders, who talked about his "finger-lickin'" recipe for fried chicken that he parlayed into the Kentucky Fried Chicken chain of restaurants, once appeared as a contestant. A guest purporting to be a wealthy Arabian prince was really writer William Peter Blatty; Groucho saw through the disguise, stating, "It was pretty obvious to me that you weren't an Arabian prince; I used to have an Arabian horse and I know what they look like." Blatty won $10,000 and used the money, after quitting his job, to support himself while he focused on establishing a career as a writer.  He would later go on to write  The Exorcist in 1971. No one in the audience knew the identity of contestant Daws Butler until he began speaking in the voice of cartoon character Huckleberry Hound. He and his partner in the episode went on to win the top prize of $10,000. Cajun politician Dudley J. LeBlanc, a Louisiana state senator and medicine showman, demonstrated his winning style at giving campaign speeches in French, also confessing (in a rare moment of candor) the truth about his signature nostrum, Hadacol: when asked what Hadacol was good for, LeBlanc admitted "about five million dollars for me last year." General Omar Bradley was teamed with an army private, and Marx goaded the private into telling Bradley everything that was wrong with the army. Professional wrestler Wild Red Berry admitted that the outcomes of matches were determined in advance, but that the injuries were real; he revealed a long list of injuries he had sustained.

Other celebrities, already famous, occasionally teamed up with their relatives to win money for themselves or for charities. On February 6, 1958, silent-film star Francis X. Bushman and his wife Iva Millicient Richardson appeared on the show and won $1,000 by successfully answering questions in a geography quiz. Arthur Godfrey's mother Kathryn was a contestant on another episode and held her own with Marx. Edgar Bergen and his then 11-year-old daughter Candice also teamed up with Marx and his daughter Melinda to win $1,000 for the Girl Scouts of the USA, with Fenneman taking on the role of quizmaster for that segment.

Other celebrity guests included Jayne Mansfield, Edith Head, Mickey Walker, Francis X. Bushman, Howard Hill, General Clarence A. Shoop, Louise Beavers, Irwin Allen, Frankie Avalon, Lord Buckley, Sammy Cahn, Ray Corrigan, Sam Coslow, Don Drysdale, Hoot Gibson, physicist and host of Exploring Albert Hibbs, Tor Johnson, Ward Kimball, Ernie Kovacs, Laura La Plante, Liberace, Joe Louis, Bob Mathias, Irish McCalla, screenwriter and author Mary Eunice McCarthy, Harry Ruby, Max Shulman, Fay Spain, Colonel John Paul Stapp, John Charles Thomas, Edith Head, Pinky Tomlin, Rocky Marciano and his mother, Charles Goren, and Johnny Weissmuller. In 1961 Groucho's brother Harpo appeared to promote his just-published autobiography, Harpo Speaks.

Cigar incident

The show's most notorious remark supposedly occurred as Groucho was interviewing Charlotte Story, who had borne 20 children (the exact number varies in tellings of the urban legend). When Marx asked why she had chosen to raise such a large family, Mrs. Story is said to have replied, "I love my husband"; to which Marx responded, "I love my cigar, but I take it out of my mouth once in awhile."  The remark was judged too risqué to be aired, according to the anecdote, and was edited out before broadcast.

Marion and Charlotte Story were indeed parents of 20 children and had appeared as contestants on the radio version of the show in 1950.  Audio recordings of the interview exist, and a reference to cigars is made ("With each new kid, do you go around passing out cigars?"), but there is no evidence of the infamous line. Marx and Fenneman both denied that the incident took place. "I get credit all the time for things I never said," Marx told Roger Ebert, in 1972. "You know that line in You Bet Your Life? The guy says he has seventeen kids and I say, 'I smoke a cigar, but I take it out of my mouth occasionally'?  I never said that." Marx's 1976 memoir recounts the episode as fact, but co-writer Hector Arce relied mostly on sources other than Marx himself—who was by then in his late eighties and mentally compromised—and was probably unaware that Marx had specifically denied speaking the legendary line. Snopes surmised the line may have been conflated with another exchange with a girl who had 16 siblings; in that episode, Groucho asked the girl how her father felt about having 17 children. She replied "my daddy loves children," and Groucho responded "Well, I like pancakes, but I haven't got a closet full of them!"

Legacy
Seven months after You Bet Your Life ended its 11-season run at NBC, Marx hosted another game show in prime time, Tell It to Groucho. It aired on CBS during the winter months of 1961 and the spring months of 1962. The game involved each of three celebrity pictures being flashed on a screen, each for a quarter of a second. The couple won $500 for each picture they identified. If the couple could not identify any of the three pictures, they were shown one picture and won $100 for a correct guess. As in You Bet Your Life, the focus of the show was on Marx's interviews with the contestants before they played the game. Replacing George Fenneman were two teenaged sidekicks, Jackson Wheeler and Patti Harmon. Both had appeared on You Bet Your Life as contestants during its final season (Harmon under her given name of Joy Harmon).

You Bet Your Life was parodied on a live April 1955 episode of The Jack Benny Program. Benny pretended to be someone else to get on the quiz show (competing with a female contestant played by Irene Tedrow), and continues to divulge information during an effort to say the secret word. In the skit, Benny is unable to answer the final question, which Groucho asks with a knowing chuckle and ironically is about Benny himself, simply because it asks his real age; as part of his comic persona, Benny would never give his age voluntarily, even for something he valued as much as money. After the sketch Groucho asked him why he opted out of the 3,000-dollar prize. Benny then gave away his age, indirectly, by saying "Where else could I buy 22 years for 3,000 dollars?" After Marx's death this film appeared in the Unknown Marx Brothers documentary on DVD. A brief clip of the episode appeared in the 2009 PBS special Make 'Em Laugh: The Funny Business of America.

The title of the show was parodied in the 1989 Weird Al Yankovic film UHF, on the U62 Fall Schedule as You Bet Your Pink Slip.

A Bugs Bunny cartoon entitled Wideo Wabbit had a scene where Bugs Bunny impersonated Groucho to Elmer Fudd for the game show You Beat Your Wife, a takeoff on the name You Bet Your Life.

An episode of Animaniacs had a segment called "You Risk Your Life" where if the secret word was said, Wakko would hit the contestant who said it on the head with a mallet. The contestants were Mrs. Myra Puntridge and Aristotle. The secret word was "yes," and Aristotle said it three times.

An episode of In Living Color had a skit called "You Bet Your Career". Jamie Foxx plays Bill Cosby, and it features washed-up celebrities competing for a walk-on role in sitcoms.

Revivals

1980–1981
In 1980, Buddy Hackett hosted a new version produced by Hill-Eubanks Productions, and syndicated by MCA. Fenneman's announcer/sidekick role was taken over by nightclub entertainer Ron Husmann.

The show would begin with Hackett performing a brief stand up routine followed by a brief chat with Husmann. Three individual contestants appeared on each episode, one at a time. The contestants were interviewed by Hackett and then played a true or false quiz of five questions in a particular category. The first correct answer to a question earned $25, and the amount doubled with each subsequent correct answer. After the fifth question, the contestant could opt to try to correctly answer a sixth question to triple their winnings; however, if the contestant was incorrect, their earnings were cut in half. Additionally, the secret word was still worth $100, and if anyone said it, each contestant on that episode won $100.

The contestant with the most money returned at the end of the show to meet "Leonard", the prize duck (If there was a tie, they would be asked a question with a numeric answer, which they wrote down, and whoever was closest without going over won).  The contestant then stopped a rotating device, causing a plastic egg to drop out which concealed the name of a bonus prize, one of which was a car.

Some episodes had celebrities, including George Fenneman, Phil Harris, and Greg Evigan appear as contestants; each played for a member of the studio audience.

1992–1993
Another version hosted by Bill Cosby aired from September 7, 1992, to June 4, 1993 (with repeats airing until September 3 of that year), in syndication. Carsey-Werner syndicated the series, the first show they distributed themselves. Cosby was joined on this show by a female announcer and sidekick, Robbi Chong, who was referred to as "Renfield". Organist Shirley Scott contributed the jazzy theme music, and the program was taped in Philadelphia at the studios of public television station WHYY-TV (the former taping site of Nickelodeon's Double Dare and Finders Keepers).

Three couples competed, with each couple playing the game individually. After the couple was introduced, they spent time talking with Cosby. When the interview was done, the game began. Each couple was staked with $750 and were then asked three questions within a category presented at the start of the game. Before each question, the couple made a wager, which would be added to their winnings if they were correct or subtracted if they were incorrect. The secret word in this version, worth $500, was delivered by a stuffed toy black goose dressed in a sweatshirt from Temple University, Cosby's alma mater; if one couple said it, a new word would be chosen when the next couple was introduced.

The couple with the most money (independent of any secret word bonuses) advanced to the bonus round, in which they were asked one last question in any given subject. A correct answer won a choice of three envelopes, which were all attached to the goose. Two of the envelopes displayed the goose's face and would double the couple's money, while the third awarded an additional $10,000.

As the 1992/93 season progressed, many stations carrying the show either moved it to overnight time slots or dropped it entirely due to low ratings.

2021–present
In September 2020, it was announced that Fox First Run would reboot the show in syndication, which premiered on September 13, 2021, with Jay Leno as host. Carsey-Werner's Tom Werner will return as executive producer. It was stated that the revival would also include bits carried over from Leno's tenure on The Tonight Show and The Jay Leno Show, such as Headlines, and that Kevin Eubanks, who had been Leno's bandleader on The Tonight Show from 1995 to 2009 and for a brief time in 2010, and The Jay Leno Show (as the Primetime band). and comic foil for much of his run on Tonight, would serve as sidekick; Leno plans on avoiding any political or topical humor to keep the show evergreen.

In this format, two teams of two contestants per show answer four questions in one category; some are multiple-choice, while others are open-ended. The first question is worth $250, and the value increases by $250 per question to a maximum of $1,000. After the fourth question, each member of the team may either end the game and keep their share of the winnings, or play a fifth question; a correct answer doubles their total, while a miss forfeits it. The secret word (sponsored by CarGurus in the first season and Bingo Blitz and Slotomania in the second season), awards a $500 bonus as in the 1992-93 revival. Starting in the second season, if the contestants answer a random question correctly, a follow-up bonus question was asked where if answered correctly, the contestants are awarded a $1,000 bonus. A team can win up to $6,500 by answering all five questions correctly, answering the bonus question correctly, and saying the secret word. If time permits at the end of an episode, one audience member is asked a question and can win a prize for giving the correct answer.

The opening comedy segments, including Headlines, were removed without fanfare at the end of November 2021; the program now begins with Jay and Kevin welcoming the first set of contestants. However, the program's website still solicits viewer submissions for the comedy segment.

Episode status
Most of the episodes still exist, with 1954–61 episodes syndicated by NBC as The Best Of Groucho. Also existing is the unaired pilot episode (TV version), which was produced for CBS on December 5, 1949. A handful of audio recordings from the radio show also exist dating as far back as 1947, as do a number of one-hour, uncut audio recordings, which were edited to create the radio version, mostly from spring 1949 and fall 1953.

Unlike most pre-1973 NBC in-house productions, it was not part of the package of series sold to National Telefilm Associates. Producer John Guedel explained why the You Bet Your Life shows were excluded: "They were slow and in black-and-white and old-fashioned. When NBC sold its library to NTA and went out of the syndication business, NTA had no interest in Groucho."  Marx's grandson, Andy Marx, confirmed the story.

While Groucho Marx was entertaining show business friends at a 1973 party, an employee at an NBC warehouse called and announced that the network was discarding its inventory of You Bet Your Life film prints to make room for newer series. The network was willing to give the reels back to Marx for free. Although Marx wasn't interested in the physical film prints, those present at the party convinced him to take the prints so they would not be destroyed. Once the hundreds of film cans arrived, Marx, dismayed at the sheer volume of the library, contacted Guedel. Guedel, anxious to see if there was still a market for the show, sold it on a trial basis to a local station for less than $50 for each night. The show became an instant success, prompting Guedel to send the reruns into syndication almost immediately.

With Guedel having "made a royalty deal with NBC to syndicate" the old shows himself, NBC still held ancillary rights of this version, thus distribution began with NBC Enterprises from 2001 to 2004.  Since September 2004, NBCUniversal Syndication Studios handles syndication rights to the Marx (non-public domain) and Hackett versions.

In the United States, public domain and official releases were distributed on home video by the following companies:

NBC Home Video (1984–85)
Ambrose Video (1988–98)
Brentwood Home Video (1998–2001)
Alpha Video Classics (2001–11)
Goodtimes DVD (2000–02)
Passion Productions (2005–present)
Brentwood Communications (2005–08)
BCI Navarre (2011–present)

Additionally, two official DVD compilations were released by Shout! Factory and Sony Music Entertainment; the first was You Bet Your Life: The Lost Episodes, released in 2003, which contained 18 classic episodes not seen since the original broadcasts, as well as numerous bonus features, including outtakes, a behind-the-scenes piece, and rare audio clips. A second release, You Bet Your Life: The Best Episodes, followed in 2004 and included another assortment of 18 original episodes, as well as three game show pilots featuring Marx among its bonus features. Both of the DVD presentations in both of SHOUT! Factory/Sony Music Entertainment's DVD releases of Groucho Marx’s You Bet Your Life were presented uncut and unedited, remastered and restored from the original kinescopes and in its original NBC broadcast presentation.

The Carsey-Werner Company owns the Cosby version, as it produced that revival with Cosby.

References and notes

External links
 You Bet Your Life with Jay Leno official Web site
 Illustrated web page depicting the changes in You Bet Your Life episodes when they were adapted into Best of Groucho episodes and Supplement page to preceding; these pages explain the relevance of the changes to copyright status
 You Bet Your Life radio shows on archive.org
 Episodes from the TV show (Public Domain)
 You Bet Your Life (Cosby) @ Carsey-Werner.net (en)
 Carsey-Werner - You Bet Your Life (Cosby)
 You Bet Your Life (1950) on IMDb
 You Bet Your Life (1980) on IMDb
 You Bet Your Life (1992) on IMDb
 You Bet Your Life (2021) on IMDb
 Snopes.com page about the "I love my cigar..." urban legend
 The Day My Grandfather Groucho and I Saved You Bet Your Life

Peabody Award-winning radio programs
NBC original programming
NBC radio programs
CBS Radio programs
ABC radio programs
1947 radio programme debuts
1960 radio programme endings
1950 American television series debuts
1961 American television series endings
1980 American television series debuts
1981 American television series endings
1992 American television series debuts
1993 American television series endings
2021 American television series debuts
1940s American comedy game shows
1950s American comedy game shows
1960s American comedy game shows
1980s American comedy game shows
1990s American comedy game shows
2020s American comedy game shows
American radio game shows
Black-and-white American television shows
English-language television shows
First-run syndicated television programs in the United States
Jay Leno
Marx Brothers
Radio programs adapted into television shows
Television series based on radio series
Television series by Universal Television
Television series by Carsey-Werner Productions
Television series by Fox Entertainment
American television series revived after cancellation